Świerczewo may refer to the following places in Poland:
Świerczewo, Poznań
Świerczewo, Szczecin
Świerczewo, Kuyavian-Pomeranian Voivodeship
Świerczewo, Goleniów County